The Team relay competition at the 2020 FIL World Luge Championships was held on 16 February 2020.

Results
The race was started at 18:06.

References

Team relay